Friedrichshafen:

 Friedrichshafen — is a city in Germany, in the federal state of Baden-Württemberg on the northern shore of Lake Constance.
 VfB Friedrichshafen — is a men's volleyball club from the city of the same name in Germany.